IPJSC Ingosstrakh (Russian: СПАО «Ингосстра́х») is one of the major insurance companies of Russia, insurance public joint-stock company. Headquartered in Moscow, Russia. Ingosstrakh is the legal successor of the Chief Agency of Foreign Insurance of the USSR founded in 1947. In 1972 transformed to the stock company (100% government shares) and in 1992 it went private.

The first subsidiary foreign companies were established in London in 1924 – Blackbalsea and in Hamburg in 1927. Four representative offices of Ingosstrakh operate in the foreign countries – Azerbaijan, Kazakhstan, India and China. In 2007, PPF Beta Ltd, managed by the Czech group PPF Investments, became one of the owners of Ingosstrakh. In January 2007 the PPF Group together with the large global insurer Generali (Italy) created the holding company Generali PPF Holding to develop the insurance operations in the countries of Eastern and Central Europe. All PPF insurance assets in Russia were transferred to this holding, including a stake in Ingosstrakh. In January 2013, the insurance business was split between PPF and Generali, according to the terms of the transaction, the holding's share in Ingosstrakh was transferred to the Italian insurance group.

Company history 
 16 November 1947: On this day the Council of Ministers of the USSR signed a decree No. 3819-1281с "On the Establishment of the Agency of Foreign Insurance of USSR (Ingosstrakh) as Part of the Agency of Foreign Operations (UINO) of Gosstrakh of USSR".
 2 June 1948: "Regulation on the Agency of Foreign Insurance of USSR (Ingosstrakh)" was approved by the decree of the Council of Ministers of the USSR.
 20 July 1972: The Council of Ministers of the USSR issued a decree which provided Ingosstrakh with the status of a Chief Agency of Foreign Insurance of USSR. At the same time, Ingosstrakh acquired a new legal status: it gained the right to operate abroad and if necessary at home as well as a joint-stock insurance company.
 1996: An edition of the company's new Articles of Association with a new name "Otkrytoye strakhovoye aktsionyernoye obshestvo Ingosstrakh", in the English language: «Ingosstrakh Joint Stock Insurance Company Ltd.», abbreviated name in the English language: Ingosstrakh Insurance Company Ltd.
 November 2010: Ingosstrakh has fully settled the insurance event, related to the destruction of towers of the World Trade Center in New York as a result of the terrorist attack which occurred on 11 September 2001. Allianz Global Risks U.S. Insurance Company acted as a risk insurer in this case. Ingosstrakh participated in its handling under the reinsurance agreement with a retrocedent, a French insurance company SCOR SE.
 April 2014: 2 April 2014. Mikhail Volkov was elected as the chief executive officer of Ingosstrakh Insurance Company for 3 years at the meeting of the board of directors of Ingosstrakh Insurance Company. He also became the President of the company's Board of Management.
 October 2018: International rating agency Standard & Poor's Global Ratings (S&P) increased long-term credit ratings of the issuer and financial sustainability rating of the insurance company Ingosstrakh from BB+ to BBB–. The outlook was Stable. Agency made such a decision due to high capitalization figures and enlarged investment portfolio quality of the company corresponding to BBB rating requirements.
 December 2018: RAEX (Expert Rating Agency) confirmed the financial safety rating of Ingosstrakh PJSIC to be ruAAA. Rating outlook was stable.

Ratings 
Good business standing of Ingosstrakh was rated by the International rating agency Standard & Poor's: the Ingosstrakh long-term credit rating of the contractor and the financial strength rating was at the level "BBB-", national scale rating was "ruAA+", rating forecast was "Stable". The Russian rating agency Expert RA reaffirmed Ingosstrakh's highest financial stability rating at A++. For the first time the insurer received such rating in 2002.

References

External links

 Official site of Ingosstrakh 
 Официальный сайт компании 
 Ingosstrakh Insurance Company
 Expert RA confirms Ingosstrakh Insurance Company rating as ruAAA 
 S&P Global Ratings rose IPJSC Ingosstrakh 
 M&A: Assicurazioni Generali verso il 55% di Ingosstrakh 
 Generali Opens Representative Office in Moscow

Insurance companies of Russia
Financial services companies established in 1947
1947 establishments in the Soviet Union
Financial services companies of the Soviet Union
Basic Element (company)
Companies based in Moscow